Jerry Williams may refer to:

Music
Jerry Lynn Williams (1948–2005), guitarist and songwriter
Jerry Williams, Jr. or Swamp Dogg (born 1942), American R&B singer, songwriter and producer
Jerry Williams (singer) (1942-2018), Swedish singer and actor
Jerry Williams (radio) (1923–2003), American radio host
Jerry Williams, founder of American band Harvest in 1977

Sports
Jerry Williams (footballer) (born 1960), English professional footballer
Jerry Williams (American football) (1923–1998), American footballer
Jerry Williams (basketball) (born 1979), American basketballer

Other people
Jerry Williams (politician) (active since 2001), American politician in Kansas
Jerry Michael Williams (1969–2000), American murder victim

See also
Jerry Coleby-Williams, Australian conservationist, horticulturalist and plant curator, since 1999 TV-presenter
Gerard Williams (disambiguation)
Gerry Williams (disambiguation)
Jeremy Williams (disambiguation)
Jerome Williams (disambiguation)